Discovery Ridge can be:

 Discovery Ridge, Calgary: a residential neighbourhood in Calgary
 A rock ridge in the Ohio Range of Antarctica
 Discovery Ridge (research park): a research park in Columbia, Missouri, owned and operated by the University of Missouri System
 Discovery Ridge, Saskatchewan: an organized hamlet in central Saskatchewan